Tshering Choden is a Bhutanese politician who has been a member of the National Assembly of Bhutan, since October 2018.

Education and professional life
She holds a Master's degree in educational leadership and management. She has worked as a teacher and a principal.

Political career
Choden ran for the seat of the National Assembly of Bhutan as a candidate of PDP in the 2013 Bhutanese National Assembly election, but was unsuccessful.

She was elected to the National Assembly of Bhutan as a candidate of DPT from Khar-Yurung constituency in 2018 Bhutanese National Assembly election. She received 4,738 votes and defeated Ugyen Tshewang, a candidate of Druk Nyamrup Tshogpa.

References 

1973 births
Living people
Bhutanese educators
Druk Phuensum Tshogpa politicians
Bhutanese MNAs 2018–2023
Bhutanese women in politics
Women school principals and headteachers
Druk Phuensum Tshogpa MNAs